Gatherers (formerly known as Gatherer) is a melodic hardcore band from Bayonne, New Jersey. Founded in 2011, Gatherers has released three full-length albums, one single, one EP, and one live release. In 2015, they signed to Equal Vision Records.

History 
The band was founded as Gatherer in 2011 by bassist Matt Popowski, drummer Adam Cichocki, vocalist Christian Berrigan, guitarist Justin Cosentino, and guitarist Austin Lipinski. They self-released their debut EP entitled Postcards in March 2012, with a vinyl release coming soon after in June via Glass Nail Records, which consisted of four songs. Cosentino was briefly replaced by Randy LeBoeuf, who was then replaced by Gianmarco Felix Guerra-Coletti.

Due to the closure of Glass Nail Records, they self-released their first full-length album entitled Caught Between a Rock and a Sad Place in June 2013. Shortly after this release, Berrigan announced his departure from the band in a Facebook post.

Vocalist Rich Weinberger joined the band in 2014 to fill the gap left behind by Berrigan. In March 2015, they released a single entitled God Deluxe which contained a song of the same name to build hype for their second full-length album, Quiet World, which was released in July that same year. The band appeared on WSOU and described the writing process as visual and driven by the way things sound (e.g. digging in dirt). In support of the album, the band embarked on the Common Vision Tour with Every Time I Die and Gnarwolves. After these releases, guitarist Gianmarco Felix Guerra-Coletti left the band.

In June 2016, the band made an appearance on Audiotree Live, wherein the band played songs from their previously released material and one new song. This doubled as a live release, which was released digitally.

After the departure of guitarist Austin Lipinski, the band gained guitarists Anthony Gesa and Rob Talalai. In June 2018, they released their third full-length album entitled We Are Alive Beyond Repair and embarked on a summer USA tour with Bent Knee.

On April 16, 2019, Gatherers released a new single called "Sick, Sad Heart" in the build up to their first European tour.

Via Flood Magazine on April 30, 2020, the band released a new single entitled "Ad Nauseam, I Drown" from their forthcoming fourth LP. They also announced that they have changed record labels and are now on No Sleep Records.

Band Members 
Current members

Past members

Live musicians

Timeline

Discography
Studio albums

EPs and singles

Live

Videos

References

External links
 
 Gatherers on Equal Vision Records
 Gatherers Bandcamp
 Gatherers Facebook

Hardcore punk groups from New Jersey
Musical groups established in 2011
2011 establishments in New Jersey
No Sleep Records artists
Equal Vision Records artists